Eric Hotz is a graphic artist and illustrator.

Early life and education
He was born in Burnaby, British Columbia, Canada and studied at Simon Fraser University, Langara College, and Capilano College, mainly studying archaeology, art history, fine arts and commercial art.

Career
Hotz worked for First Encounter Magazine (DELF) 1983 to 1984, and  Columbia Games Inc. from 1984 to 2000, and was the in-house illustrator, production editor, and cartographer for their Hârn books. He did the design and art for the role-playing game High Colonies (1988) for Waterford Publishing House Ltd. He produced many of Columbia's interior color, black line art, map work, cover art, for their Hârn (an RPG world) books line as well board game map art for their board game lines (Rommel In The Desert, EastFront, WestFront, 1812, Bobby Lee, Sam Grant, and many other titles) including their cover art, and rules book line art. In 1992 he started working freelance for Columbia Games, for which he produced art for the card game Dixie. He eventually also worked freelance for companies/publishers like: TSR, Inc. (Dungeons & Dragons), Wizards of the Coast (Talislanta and Dungeons & Dragons), White Wolf Publishing (Vampire: The Dark Ages and Werewolf: The Apocalypse), Atlas Games, Avalon Hill, and many other RPG/Game publishers. Some of his notable works include the entirety of the card art for the trading card games, Dixie and Eagles (both published by Columbia Games Inc.), of which over 1,000 cards were illustrated within a period of a year and a half. More recently, he has been working more for himself, creating Whitewash City, a large set of PDF wild west cardstock buildings, which he researched and designed from historical sources, many from actual surviving Old West buildings. He also created Roman Seas, recreating authentic Roman warships and merchant ships in PDF file format for paper construction. Eric has also been known to take on the occasional art project, logo design, spot illustrations for various book publishers, Llewellyn projects (tarot card illustration), and much more. In 2005, he founded his own company, Hotz ArtWorks, and has also begun a line of silk-screened felt game mats (felt products) from his studio in Canada. In addition, Eric Hotz was the co-author of the Online comic strip, Larry Leadhead from 2000 through September 2012.  Beginning in September 2012-2019 Hotz also worked in the educational field as a creative director for educational teaching companies. In February 2020, Hotz had his first solo art show at the MAC art gallery in Mission, BC, Canada where he featured paintings and illustrations on natural history subjects.

References

External links
 Official website
 
YouTube Podcast: First Encounter Magazine/DELF: January 25, 2020. https://www.youtube.com/watch?v=vWsArmQMVvU

Langara College people
Living people
People from Burnaby
Role-playing game artists
Simon Fraser University alumni
Year of birth missing (living people)